The standardized approach for counterparty credit risk (SA-CCR) is the capital requirement framework under Basel III addressing counterparty risk for derivative trades. It was published  by the Basel Committee in March 2014.

The framework replaced both non-internal model approaches: the Current Exposure Method (CEM) and the Standardised Method (SM). It is intended to be a "risk-sensitive methodology", i.e. conscious of asset class and hedging, that differentiates between margined and non-margined trades and recognizes netting benefits; considerations insufficiently addressed under the preceding frameworks.

SA-CCR calculates the exposure at default of derivatives and "long-settlement transactions" exposed to counterparty credit risk. 
It builds EAD as 
(i) a "Replacement Cost" (RC), were the counterparty to default today; 
combined with (ii) the "Potential Future Exposure" (PFE) to the counterparty. 
For the former: current exposure, i.e. mark-to-market of the trades, is aggregated by counterparty, and then netted-off with haircutted- collateral. 
For the latter: 
per asset class, trade "add-ons", as reduced by offsetting based on correlation assumptions, are aggregated to "hedging sets";
these are then aggregated to "netting sets", and offset by the counterparty's collateral (i.e. initial margin), which is subject to a "multiplier" that limits its benefit and applies a 5% floor to the exposure.

The SA-CCR EAD is an input to the bank's regulatory capital calculation where it is combined with the counterparty's PD and LGD to derive RWA; Some banks thus incorporate SA-CCR into their KVA calculations. Because of its two-step aggregation, capital allocation between trading desks (or even asset classes) is challenging; thus making it difficult to fairly calculate each desk's  risk-adjusted return on capital. Various methods are then proposed here. SA-CCR is also input to other regulations such as the leverage ratio and the net stable funding ratio.

References 

Credit risk
Capital requirement
Derivatives (finance)